Wire Waltz is the second album from band The Last Town Chorus, released in 2006, three years after their eponymous debut. It contains the band's most well known track, a cover of David Bowie's "Modern Love", also featured in a season two episode of Grey's Anatomy.

By the time the album was recorded, former member Nat Gut had departed the band.

Track listing

Singles
"Modern Love" was released as the only single from the album. It was released on 7" vinyl in the UK with "Wintering In Brooklyn" as a B-side.

Personnel
All tracks written and produced by Megan Hickey, except as noted. Hickey performs Lap Steel Guitar and Vocals on all tracks.
Other personnel as noted below.

"Wire Waltz"
 Percussion: Mark Fredericks & Alan Bezozi
 Bass: Ken Heitmeuller
 Hammond Organ & Piano: Joe McGinty
 Violin: Maxim Moston
 Guitar: Pete Galub

"You"
 Guitar: Pete Galub
 Percussion: Alan Bezozi
 Harmony Vocals: Amy Allison

"Modern Love"
 Written by David Bowie
 Guitar: Pete Galub
 Percussion: Alan Bezozi
 Electric Piano & Vocals: Greta Gertler
 Bass: Bryon Isaccs

"Caroline"
 Guitar: Pete Galub
 Percussion: Alan Bezozi
 Bass: Bryon Issacs
 Bark: Sailer

"It's Not Over"
 Guitar: Pete Galub
 Percussion: Alan Bezozi
 Harmony Vocals: Amy Allison
 Bass: Bryon Isaccs

"Understanding"
 Guitar: Pete Galub
 Drums: Mark Fredericks
 Percussion: Alan Bezozi
 Bass: Ken Heitmeuller
 Violin: Maxim Moston

"Boat"
 Guitar: Pete Galub
 Percussion: Alan Bezozi
 Organ & Vocals: Greta Gertler

"Huntsville, 1989"
 Electric Piano: Megan Hickey
 Programming: Dan Hickey

"Wintering In Brooklyn"
 Guitar: Pete Galub
 Drums: Mark Fredericks
 Bass: Ken Heitmeuller

"Foreign Land"
 Guitar: Pete Galub & Jeremy Parzen
 Harmony Vocals: Amy Allison
 Percussion: Alan Bezozi
 Bass: Bryon Isaacs
 Piano: Lois Toman

References

2006 albums
The Last Town Chorus albums